Higley High School is a high school in Gilbert, Arizona, United States. It is one of two high schools run by the Higley Unified School District.

On May 11, 2018, Higley's Varsity Boys Volleyball team led by Head Coach Andrew Yamashiro defeated American Leadership Academy – Queen Creek 3–2 to capture the 5A State Title.

References

Public high schools in Arizona
Educational institutions established in 2001
Schools in Maricopa County, Arizona
Education in Gilbert, Arizona
2001 establishments in Arizona